The Cross-Roads is a 1912 silent short film drama directed by Frederick A. Thomson and produced by the Vitagraph Company of America. It starred George Cooper and Zena Keefe.

It is preserved in the Library of Congress collection.

Cast
George Cooper - Kirke Dundee
Zena Keefe - Charity Hale
Mary Maurice - Phoebe Hale, Chrity's Mother
Charles Eldridge - Abel Hale
Hal Wilson - Lawyer Salmon
Florence Ashbrooke - Toby's Mother
Frank Currier - Kirke's Uncle

References

External links
The Cross-Roads at IMDb.com

1912 films
American silent short films
American black-and-white films
Vitagraph Studios short films
1912 short films
1912 drama films
Silent American drama films
Films directed by Frederick A. Thomson
1910s American films